The 2017 America East Conference women's soccer tournament was the postseason women's soccer tournament for the America East Conference held from October 26 through November 5, 2017. The five-match tournament took place at campus sites, with the higher seed hosting. The six-team single-elimination tournament consisted of three rounds based on seeding from regular season conference play. The defending champions were the Albany Great Danes, but they were eliminated from the 2017 tournament with a 2–1 loss in the quarterfinals to the Vermont Catamounts. The Stony Brook Seawolves won the tournament with a 2–1 victory over the Vermont Catamounts in the final. The conference tournament title was the second for the Stony Brook women's soccer program and the first for head coach Brendan Faherty.

Bracket

Schedule

Quarterfinals

Semifinals

Final

Statistics

Goalscorers 

2 goals
 Manuela Corcho - Stony Brook
 Brooke Jenkins - Vermont

1 goal
 Allyson Baner - Stony Brook
 Christen Cahill - Stony Brook
 Alyssa Francese - Stony Brook
 Katie Gowing - Albany
 Sarah Martin - Vermont
 Taylor Palmer - Vermont

See also 
 2017 America East Conference Men's Soccer Tournament

References 

 
America East Conference Women's Soccer Tournament